"Go Rest High on That Mountain" is a song written and recorded by American country music artist Vince Gill. It was released in August 1995 as the sixth single from his album When Love Finds You. It is a eulogic ballad. Gill began writing the song following the death of country music singer Keith Whitley in 1989. Gill did not finish the song until a few years later following the death of his older brother Bob of a heart attack in 1993. Ricky Skaggs and Patty Loveless both sang background vocals on the record.

Content
"Go Rest High on That Mountain" is a tribute to an unnamed party who has died. It is composed in the key of D major with a slow tempo, largely following the chord pattern D-G-D-A-D.

Gill added a third verse in December 2019 saying “Yeah, it doesn’t make much sense, does it?” he told People. “Yeah, ‘Leave it alone, you idiot!’ That should be my mantra. But in my heart, I think this makes it better.”

Critical reception
Deborah Evans Price of Billboard magazine reviewed the song favorably calling the song "beautiful, majestic, and easily one of the best singles of Gill's already distinguished career." She goes on to say that the composition "boasts a touching spiritual lyric and Gill's consistently impeccable vocal delivery." In 2019, Rolling Stone ranked "Go Rest High on That Mountain" No. 17 on its list of the 40 Saddest Country Songs of All Time.

The song won the CMA's Song of the Year award in 1996 and a BMI Most-Performed Song award in 1997. It also received two Grammy Awards for Best Male Country Vocal Performance and Best Country Song in the 38th Grammy Awards. The single reached No. 14 on the Country Singles chart in 1995.  It has sold 857,000 digital copies in the US since becoming available for download.

Music video
The music video was directed by John Lloyd Miller and premiered in mid-1995. Filmed at the Ryman Auditorium in downtown Nashville, it features Gill performing the song (accompanied by Loveless and Skaggs on the choruses) while images of nature such as mountains, forests, and sunrises play on screens behind him.

George Jones eulogy
On May 2, 2013, Gill performed the song with Loveless at the funeral of fellow country artist George Jones. At one point during the performance, Gill became too emotional to sing some of the words, but was able to complete the song by focusing primarily on his guitar playing, with Loveless stepping up to complete the back-up vocals and harmony. In a speech just prior to Gill's and Loveless' performance, Gill underlined their duet by stating that he always was aware of a "special anointing" in his duets with Loveless, and compared them particularly to Jones' duets with singer Melba Montgomery during the 1960s.

Personnel
Compiled from the liner notes.
Stuart Duncan – fiddle
Vince Gill – lead vocals, electric guitar, electric guitar solo
John Hughey – steel guitar
John Barlow Jarvis – Hammond B-3 organ
Patty Loveless – backing vocals
Tom Roady – percussion
Michael Rhodes – bass guitar
Randy Scruggs – acoustic guitar
Ricky Skaggs – backing vocals
Steuart Smith – electric guitar
Carlos Vega – drums
Pete Wasner – keyboards, piano

Chart performance
"Go Rest High on That Mountain" debuted at number 70 on the U.S. Billboard Hot Country Singles & Tracks for the week of September 2, 1995.  The song has sold 857,000 digital copies as of November 2019 after it became available for download in the U.S.

Year-end charts

See also
Vince Gill discography

Notes

1995 singles
1994 songs
Vince Gill songs
Ricky Skaggs songs
Patty Loveless songs
Song recordings produced by Tony Brown (record producer)
Songs written by Vince Gill
Commemoration songs
MCA Records singles
Music videos directed by John Lloyd Miller
Grammy Award for Best Male Country Vocal Performance winners